"Tenderness" is a song by English new wave band General Public, released as a single in May 1984 from their debut studio album All the Rage (1984) by I.R.S. Records.

Content
The song's lyrics tell about a man who really needs tenderness to feel like a man. It was one of the band's first singles. The single cover of the extended versions has a sentence reading "words like conviction can turn into a sentence".

Charts

Popular Culture
This song was featured in the 1995 film Clueless during the bouquet-catching scene at the end of the movie. 
It was also used in the John Hughes films Sixteen Candles 
The song was heard in the film, Weird Science. 
It has also been featured in the tv show The Goldbergs.

References

1984 songs
1984 singles
General Public songs
I.R.S. Records singles